Affinity Credit Union is a financial institution headquartered in Saskatoon, Saskatchewan, Canada, with headquarters in the city of Saskatoon. As of August 2019, Affinity operates 56 branches in 47 communities across Saskatchewan. It is the second-largest credit union in Saskatchewan and the eighth-largest in Canada, with $6.9 billion in managed assets. Affinity Credit Union employs 791 people and serves 141,587 members. Affinity is also a member of the World Council of Credit Unions and the Global Alliance for Banking on Values.

Affinity Credit Union is also the owner of a number of independently managed Insurance Brokerages throughout Saskatchewan, operating under the name Affinity Insurance Services.

References

Canadian companies established in 2005
Banks established in 2005
Credit unions of Saskatchewan
Companies based in Saskatoon